Raduša can refer to:

Raduša (Tutin), a village in the Tutin municipality, Serbia
Raduša (Ub), a village in the Ub municipality, Serbia
Raduša (Užice), a village in the Užice municipality, Serbia
Raduša, Tešanj, a village in the Tešanj municipality, Bosnia and Herzegovina
 Raduša (mountain), in central-western Bosnia and Herzegovina
 Raduša, Saraj, village in Macedonia, near Skopje

Serbo-Croatian place names